The black thicket fantail (Rhipidura maculipectus) is a species of bird in the family Rhipiduridae. It is found in the Aru Islands and New Guinea. This species is one of 47 in the genus Rhipidura.

Description 
This is a medium-sized, long-tailed bird measuring 18-19cm and weighing 18-19g. The plumage is blackish with white spots on the chest and wings and a white tip of the tail. There is as well a short white stripe above the eye and white spot on the side of the neck. The tail is often upturned and fanned out.  The iris is dark brown, the beak is black with pinkish underside. Males and females are similar but females have fewer spots and more pale abdomen. Juveniles are sooty black all over except for an indistinct white supraorbital spot and white tips on the tail feathers.

Black thicket fantail is similar to White-bellied thicket fantail (R. leucothorax), but the last is differed by its white breast (which is reflected in its name). This species is also similar to Sooty thicket fantail (R. threnothorax) but that one has no white tip of the tale.

Habitats and behavior 
The majority of fantails are strong fliers, and some species can undertake long migrations, but black thicket fantail as well as the other thicket fantails (sooty thicket fantail and white-bellied thicket fantail) are very weak fliers, and need to alight regularly.

The birds of this species are very secretive and it is rather difficult to notice them. Their natural habitats are subtropical or tropical moist lowland forests and subtropical or tropical mangrove forests.

Like other fantails, black thicket ones are entomophages. They are feeding usually within 1-2 meters from the ground. They are catching insects on the fly, by horizontal throws from a low perch.

The voice is a rising, ringing, metallic song followed by a «wee-chuv!».

Citations

References

External links
Rhipidura maculipectus on BirdLife International
Rhipidura maculipectus on BioLib.cz
 Black thicket fantail Rhipidura maculipectus Gray, GR, 1858 at «xeno-canto» website — Birds' Voices all over the world 

black thicket fantail
Birds of the Aru Islands
Birds of New Guinea
black thicket fantail
black thicket fantail
Taxonomy articles created by Polbot